There are two communities named Valencia in the U.S. state of New Mexico:

Valencia, Santa Fe County, New Mexico
Valencia, Valencia County, New Mexico